Lash is a fictional supervillain appearing in American comic books published by Marvel Comics. The character is an Inhuman. Created by writer Charles Soule and artist Joe Madureira, he first appeared in Inhuman #1 (June 2014), and plays a key role after the release of the Terrigen Mists around the globe at the conclusion of the "Infinity" storyline.

Lash appeared in the third and fifth seasons of the Marvel Cinematic Universe (MCU) series Agents of S.H.I.E.L.D., portrayed by Matt Willig as Lash and Blair Underwood as his human alter-ego Andrew Garner, previously introduced in the second season.

Publication history
Lash was created by writer Charles Soule and artist Joe Madureira, and first appeared in Inhuman #1 (June 2014).

According to Charles Soule, the character comes from Orollan, another Inhuman city:

Soule has said that "He's trying to do what he can to both collect strong Inhumans to help his own society, but also cleanse the planet of Inhumans who should never have received Terrigenesis in the first place", because "the idea is that not everyone on Earth sees all these new Inhumans popping up as a good thing."

He also appears in All-New Invaders Issues # 14 to recruit more Inhumans.

Fictional character biography
Born in the hidden Inhuman city of Orollan (which is somewhere in Greenland), Lash was among the few Inhumans of his generation chosen to undergo Terrigenesis. When the Inhuman King Black Bolt activated a Terrigen Bomb above New York flooding the world with Terrigen Mist and awakening the powers of Inhuman descendants living among humanity (as seen at the end of the "Infinity" storyline and the start of the Inhumanity storyline), Lash embarked on a mission to find all the individuals affected and judge for himself whether they were worthy to live with their new abilities. Upon arriving in Illinois, Lash encountered a newly created Inhuman named Dante Pertuz. He attempted to persuade Dante to join him at Orollan until he was stopped by the Inhuman Queen Medusa.

Recruiting a NuHuman named Jason in Minnesota, Lash teleports them both to Orollan. There, he explains that Jason and his family were descendants of the Inhumans and while his family may have died during Terrigenesis, Jason has survived and will now have a home among his fellow survivors. With their gifts, they can rebuild the city and perform wonders. Lash shows Jason the most sacred space in Orollan—the Terrigenesis chamber. Here, they hoarded the crystals that bestow Terrigenesis that will show the worthy their true form. Lash says Jason must call himself Korvostax now and introduces him to other NuHumans who explain that humans have formed mobs and attacked them in their communities. The other NuHumans in Lash's group blame Medusa. Lash's new recruits are rebuilding a wall despite a near-total lack of prior experience. Jason asks why Lash isn't showing them how to do this, and the others tell him it isn't wise to speak like that—there used to be two more NuHumans in the group. The New Attilan group teleports nearby, looking to capture Lash at the advice of Lineage. Lash tells the others that Queen Medusa means to kill them, and urges them to fight. As the battle develops between the New Attilan group and Lash's group, Jason taps into his powers for the first time and begins throwing rocks at Gorgon. Lash absorbs the energy of a volcanic spring to power energy blasts that he fires randomly into the scrum. Jason is saved from death by Gorgon who then stuns Lash with a small earth tremor. Taking hold of Lash, Medusa pins him, then invites Lineage to step forward and tell Lash what he told her. Lineage explains that Black Bolt originally released the Terrigen Cloud because something is coming for the Inhumans and they need everyone to hold it back with as many hidden bloodlines from every nation on Earth united. If they cannot prepare, their species (and maybe humans as well) will become extinct. Medusa gathers the NuHumans and tells Lash that he can either help her, stay away, or face defeat. It is also mentioned that Lash can tell Ennilux and the others from her what has transpired.

During the Civil War II storyline, Lash is told about Iron Man abducting Ulysses Cain from New Attilan by Maximus. He considered what Iron Man did as an act of war against all Inhumans. This led to Lash's group destroying the Stark Manufacturing Facility SZ-4 near Zurich, Switzerland so that they can force Medusa's hand for an attack on Iron Man. This led to Medusa and the Ultimates fighting Lash's group until Medusa teleports them to the Triskelion where Lash and his followers are taken into custody.

After escaping from the Triskelion, Lash and his followers learn that Black Bolt is back on Earth and that he is no longer powerful than before. They take advantage of this and attack Black Bolt. After Lash abducted Blinky and took him to Orollan, Black Bolt surrendered to him as Lash states that he will use Black Bolt's blood to make his own Terrigen bomb to make new Inhumans. Before Lash can go ahead with this plan, he and Jack Chain were killed by Blinky who was possessed by the Jailer.

Powers and abilities
Lash has various energy conversion abilities:

 Energy Conversion: Lash can convert energy from various sources and subsequently emit it from his palms. His powers are capable of disintegrating a living being.
 Energy Absorption: He can draw the necessary force needed to convert said energy into another energy form for him to use.
 Energy Manipulation: Lash has shown he can control whatever energy he happens to have on hand at the time for a variety of effects beyond just disintegration blasts.
 Energy Shield
According to Soule "Let's say someone's running at him — that's kinetic energy. Lash can change all of that into heat — and whoosh! — the other guy goes up in flames."

In other media

Television

Lash appears in the third season of Agents of S.H.I.E.L.D. portrayed by Matt Willig. Executive producer Jed Whedon explains that the show's adaptation of the character is different from the comics, but some elements are inspired from the source material. This version of Lash is depicted as having black skin. Lash first appeared in the episode "Laws of Nature" and the episode "Devils You Know" revealed that he can transform into a human form. The episode "Among Us Hide..." revealed that Andrew Garner (portrayed by Blair Underwood), a psychologist at Culver University working for S.H.I.E.L.D. and ex-husband of Agent Melinda May (portrayed by Ming-Na Wen), is Lash's human form who went through Terrigenesis while investigating an Inhuman genealogy ledger that was kept by Jiaying (portrayed by Dichen Lachman). The show explains Lash's ability to return to his human form as his transition phase before he fully becomes an Inhuman. Similar to his comics' version, Lash searches for and kills every unworthy Inhuman without prejudice. Lash even enlisted an Inhuman named Dwight Frye who can react to any nearby Inhumans to help find any worthy and unworthy ones. While he has attempted to kill Lincoln Campbell, Lash's victim included Alisha Whitely's clone, levitating Inhuman Shane Henson, pyrokinetic Inhuman Lori Henson, Dwight Frye after he served his purpose, and an assortment of unnamed Inhumans and Hydra Agents. Garner later surrenders himself to S.H.I.E.L.D. before the transformation becomes permanent and manages to say goodbye to May before completely becoming Lash. After saving Daisy Johnson (portrayed by Chloe Bennet) from Hive in Grant Ward's body (portrayed by Brett Dalton) and his "Inhuman Primitives" in the episode "Emancipation," he purged her of Hive's control and killed at least three Inhuman primitives before dying upon being impaled by Hellfire's chain. May later mourned his death. In the episode "The Real Deal," a fear manifestation of Lash is among the fear manifestations released when the Kree Beacon exploded near the three monoliths. It was destroyed by Phil Coulson and Deathlok.

Video games
Lash is a playable character in Marvel: Future Fight.

References

External links
 Lash at Marvel Wiki
 
 Lash at Comic Vine

Characters created by Charles Soule
Characters created by Joe Madureira
Comics characters introduced in 2014
Fictional characters with absorption or parasitic abilities
Fictional characters with energy-manipulation abilities
Inhumans
Marvel Comics characters with superhuman strength
Marvel Comics television characters